The boreal bluet (Enallagma boreale) is a species of damselfly in the family Coenagrionidae.

Description

Adult 
The boreal bluet is a small damselfly with a length of 1 to 1.6 inches (26 to 40 mm) long. The male is predominately blue on the sides of its thorax, and the upper side of its abdomen. Its lower abdominal appendages are longer than its upper appendages. The female's body is greenish-yellow to brown color. The upper side of its abdomen is mostly black.

Nymph 
The nymph of the boreal bluet is small in size with a length of  0.75 to 1 inch (19 to 23 mm). It has the typical slender shape of many immature damselflies. Nymphs range in color from light to dark brown.

Distribution 
United States: (Alaska • Arizona • California • Colorado • Connecticut • Idaho • Iowa • Indiana • Massachusetts • Maine • Michigan • Missouri • Montana • New Hampshire • New Jersey • New Mexico • Ohio • Pennsylvania • Rhode Island • U.S. Virgin Islands • Utah • Vermont • Washington • Wisconsin • West Virginia)
Canada: (Alberta • British Columbia • Manitoba • New Brunswick • Northwest Territories • Nova Scotia • Nunavut • Ontario • Prince Edward Island • Quebec • Saskatchewan • Yukon • Newfoundland)

Habitat 
The boreal bluet occurs along lakes, ponds, marshes, and streams with slow to moderate flow. This species occurs in a wide variety of habitats, from sagebrush desert to mountain lakes.

Flight season 
Boreal bluets can have a flight season of early June to late August. They also have a flight season from late March to late September.

Diet

Adult 
The boreal bluet eats a wide variety of small soft-bodied flying insects, including mosquitoes, mayflies, flies and small moths. They will sometimes pick small insects such as aphids from plants.

Nymph 
The nymph eats a wide variety of aquatic insects, such as mosquito larvae, mayfly larvae, and other aquatic fly larvae.

Ecology 
The boreal bluet looks almost identical to the northern bluet. Even both of these species share similar ranges in North America, they are almost never found at the same body of water. Both the boreal bluet and the northern bluet are found early in the season. The reasons for this separation remains still unknown.

Reproduction 
Male boreal bluets set up territories at their choice breeding sites. After both genders mate, the female boreal bluet oviposits in aquatic vegetation.

Similar species 
Like many bluets in the genus Enallagma many species look similar to each other. The boreal bluet looks has similar to many bluet species.  They include the northern bluet, familiar bluet, Hagen's bluet, marsh bluet, and vernal bluet. It can be distinguished from familiar bluet by the large postocular spots and the shorter cerci. The characteristics shared by northern and boreal bluets are their large eyespots, and a mushroom-shaped black spot on abdominal segment S2. Its best seen dorsally.

Subspecies 
Enallagma boreale has two different subspecies. The following are the two subspecies:
Enallagma boreale boreale
Enallagma boreale yezoense

Conservation 
Boreal bluet populations are currently widespread, abundant, and secure.

References 

Ordonates Frame
Boreal Bluet - Enallagma boreale
Wisconsin Odonata Survey - Enallagma boreale
Enallagma boreale (Boreal Bluet)
Damselflies, Zygoptera, of California
Enallagma annexum, Northern Bluet and Enallagma boreale, Boreal Bluet

Coenagrionidae
Odonata of North America
Insects of Canada
Insects of the United States
Fauna of the Eastern United States
Fauna of the Western United States
Insects described in 1875
Taxa named by Edmond de Sélys Longchamps